Dimitar Ivanov Kostov (born 27 July 1936) is a Bulgarian football defender who played for Bulgaria in the 1962 FIFA World Cup. He also played for Slavia Sofia.

References

External links

1936 births
Living people
Bulgarian footballers
Bulgaria international footballers
Association football defenders
PFC Slavia Sofia players
First Professional Football League (Bulgaria) players
1962 FIFA World Cup players